Segue 2 is a dwarf spheroidal galaxy situated in the constellation Aries and discovered in 2009 in the data obtained by Sloan Digital Sky Survey. It is classified as a dwarf spheroidal galaxy (dSph) meaning that it has an approximately round shape with a half-light radius of about 34 parsecs.

The name is due to the fact that it was found by the SEGUE program, the Sloan Extension for Galactic Understanding and Exploration.

Segue 2 is one of the smallest and faintest satellites of the Milky Way—its integrated luminosity is about 800 times that of the Sun (absolute visible magnitude of about −2.5), which is much lower than the luminosity of the majority of globular clusters. However, the mass of the galaxy—about 550,000 solar masses—is substantial, corresponding to the mass-to-light ratio of about 650.

The stellar population of Segue 2 consists mainly of old stars formed more than 12 billion years ago. The metallicity of these old stars is also very low at [Fe/H] < −2, which means that they contain at least 100 times less heavy elements than the Sun. The stars of Segue 2 were probably among the first stars to form in the universe. Currently, there is no star formation in Segue 2.

Segue 2 is located near the edge of Sagittarius Stream and at the same distance. It may once have been a satellite of Sagittarius Dwarf Elliptical Galaxy or its star cluster.

In June 2013 The Astrophysical Journal reported that Segue 2 was bound together with dark matter.

Around 1,000 stars are supposed to exist within the galaxy.

References

Dwarf spheroidal galaxies
Aries (constellation)
Local Group
Milky Way Subgroup
?
4713565